Dendryphantes arboretus is a jumping spider in the genus Dendryphantes  that lives in Zimbabwe.

References

Salticidae
Arthropods of Zimbabwe
Spiders of Africa
Spiders described in 2008